The following is an overview of 1929 in film, including significant events, a list of films released and notable births and deaths.

Top-grossing films (U.S.)
The top ten 1929 released films by box office gross in North America are as follows:

Events
The days of the silent film are numbered. A mad scramble to provide synchronized sound is on.
 February 1 – The Broadway Melody is released by MGM and becomes the first major musical film of the sound era, sparking a host of imitators as well as a series of Broadway Melody films that will run until 1940.
 February 18 – The first Academy Awards, or Oscars, are announced for the year ended August 1, 1928.
 March 3 – William Fox announces that he has taken control of Loews Inc., including its subsidiary Metro-Goldwyn-Mayer, buying shares from Marcus Loew's widow and sons and Nicholas Schenck for $50 million.  The acquisition eventually falls through.
 May 16 – The first Academy Awards are distributed at The Hollywood Roosevelt Hotel in Los Angeles.
 May 26 – Fox Grandeur News is shown in Fox Film's new widescreen 70 mm Grandeur film format
 July 13 – The first all color talkie (in Technicolor), On with the Show, is released by Warner Bros. who lead the way in a new color revolution just as they had ushered in that of the talkies.
 July 17 – William Fox is badly injured in a car accident which kills his chauffeur.
 August 3 – The Cock-Eyed World beats every known gross for any box office attraction throughout the world with a reported first week gross of $173,391 at the Roxy Theatre (New York City).
 August 20 – Hallelujah! is the first Hollywood film to contain an entire black cast.
 August 22 – First in the Walt Disney Productions' animated short Silly Symphony series, The Skeleton Dance, is released.
 September – Paramount Pictures acquires 49% of CBS.
 October 24 – Jean Harlow signs a five-year, $100 per week contract with Howard Hughes. 
 October 30 – Entertainment newspaper Variety report that Wall Street Lays An Egg leading to many prominent showman and film stars losing money on their investments.
 November –  Warner Bros. gain complete control of First National Pictures buying Fox Film's 36% stake for $10 million
 November 10 – Première of John Grierson's documentary film Drifters about North Sea herring fishermen, made for the Empire Marketing Board, effectively inaugurating the British Documentary Film Movement. (It debuts at the private Film Society in London on a double-bill with the U.K. première of Eisenstein's The Battleship Potemkin.)
 November 15 – U.K. release of Atlantic, a film about the sinking of the RMS Titanic which is one of the first British sound-on-film movies and, in its simultaneously-shot German-language version, the first to be released in Germany; also the first Titanic movie with sound.
 December – Anti-trust suits are filed against William Fox and Warner Bros. by the US Department of Justice for Fox's acquisition of Loews and Warners' acquisition of the Stanley Corporation of America and First National.

Academy Awards

The 2nd Academy Awards honored the best films released between August 1, 1928, and July 31, 1929. They took place on April 3, 1930, at an awards banquet in the Cocoanut Grove of the Ambassador Hotel in Los Angeles.

Most nominations: In Old Arizona (Fox Film Corporation) – 5

Best Picture: The Broadway Melody (MGM)
Best Director: Frank Lloyd – The Divine Lady
Best Actor: Warner Baxter – In Old Arizona
Best Actress: Mary Pickford – Coquette

Most awards – no film won more than 1 award

Note: Prior to 1933, awards were not based on calendar years.  Best Picture, Actress and Director went to 1930 films.

Notable films released in 1929
United States unless stated otherwise.

A
After the Verdict (lost), directed by Henrik Galeen, starring Olga Chekhova – (GB)
Alibi, directed by Roland West, starring Chester Morris and Mae Busch, based on the 1927 stage play Nightstick by Elaine Sterne Carrington
The Alley Cat (Nachtgestalten), directed by Hans Steinhoff, starring Mabel Poulton – (GB/Germany)
The American Prisoner, directed by Thomas Bentley, starring Carl Brisson and Madeleine Carroll – (GB)
Ang Mutya Ng Pamilihan (The Pearl of the Markets), directed by José Nepomuceno – (Philippines)
Applause, directed by Rouben Mamoulian, starring Helen Morgan
Arsenal (Арсенал), directed by Alexander Dovzhenko – (U.S.S.R.)
Asphalt, directed by Joe May, starring Gustav Fröhlich – (Germany)
Atlantic, directed by E. A. Dupont, starring Madeleine Carroll – (GB)
The Awful Truth (lost), directed by Marshall Neilan

B
Berth Marks, directed by Lewis R. Foster, starring Laurel and Hardy
Big Business, directed by James W. Horne and Leo McCarey, starring Laurel and Hardy
Big Time, directed by Kenneth Hawks, starring Lee Tracy
Blackmail, directed by Alfred Hitchcock, based on the 1928 stage play by Charles Bennett – (GB)
Black Waters (lost), directed by Marshall Neilan
The Bridge of San Luis Rey, directed by Charles Brabin, starring Lili Damita
Broadway, directed by Paul Fejos, starring Evelyn Brent
The Broadway Melody, directed by Harry Beaumont, starring Charles King, Anita Page and Bessie Love
Bulldog Drummond, directed by F. Richard Jones, starring Ronald Colman

C
Cagliostro, directed by Richard Oswald, based on the 1929 novel by Johannes von Guenther – (Germany)
The Canary Murder Case, directed by Malcolm St. Clair, starring William Powell, Louise Brooks and Jean Arthur
Chamber of Horrors, directed by Walter Summers – (GB)
The Charlatan, directed by George Melford
Un Chien Andalou (An Andalusian Dog), directed by Luis Buñuel and Salvador Dalí – (France)
Children of the Ritz (lost), directed by John Francis Dillon
The Clue of the New Pin, directed by Arthur Maude – (GB)
The Cocoanuts, directed by Robert Florey and Joseph Santley, starring the Marx Brothers
A Cottage on Dartmoor, directed by Anthony Asquith – (GB)
Coquette, Directed by Sam Taylor, starring Mary Pickford, Johnny Mack Brown and Matt Moore

D
Dangerous Curves, directed by Lothar Mendes, starring Clara Bow and Richard Arlen
Darkened Rooms, directed by Louis J. Gasnier, starring Evelyn Brent and Neil Hamilton
Desert Nights, directed by William Nigh, starring John Gilbert, Ernest Torrence, and Mary Nolan
The Desert Song, directed by Roy Del Ruth
Devil-May-Care, directed by Sidney Franklin, starring Ramón Novarro
Diary of a Lost Girl (Tagebuch einer Verlorenen), directed by G. W. Pabst, starring Louise Brooks – (Germany)
Disraeli, directed by Alfred E. Green, starring George Arliss and Joan Bennett
Drifters, documentary by John Grierson – (GB)
Dynamite, directed by Cecil B. DeMille, starring Conrad Nagel and Kay Johnson

E
Eternal Love, directed by Ernst Lubitsch, starring John Barrymore

F
Fancy Baggage (lost), directed by John G. Adolfi, starring Audrey Ferris and Myrna Loy
Father Vojtech (Páter Vojtěch), directed by Martin Frič – (Czechoslovakia)
Finis Terræ, directed by Jean Epstein – (France)
The Flying Fleet, directed by George Hill, starring Ramón Novarro, Ralph Graves and Anita Page
The Flying Scotsman, directed by Castleton Knight, starring Ray Milland – (GB)
Footlights and Fools (lost), directed by William A. Seiter, starring Colleen Moore and Fredric March
The Four Feathers, directed by Merian C. Cooper, starring William Powell, Richard Arlen, Fay Wray, Clive Brook and Noah Beery Sr.
Fox Movietone Follies of 1929 (lost), directed by David Butler
Fräulein Else (Miss Else), directed by Paul Czinner, starring Elisabeth Bergner – (Germany)

G
General Crack, directed by Alan Crosland, starring John Barrymore
The General Line (Staroye i novoye), directed by Grigori Aleksandrov and Sergei Eisenstein – (U.S.S.R.)
Glorifying the American Girl, directed by John W. Harkrider and Millard Webb, starring Mary Eaton
Gold Diggers of Broadway (lost), directed by Roy Del Ruth
The Great Gabbo, directed by James Cruze, starring Erich von Stroheim and Betty Compson

H
Hallelujah, directed by King Vidor
Hardboiled Rose, directed by F. Harmon Weight, starring Myrna Loy
Hearts in Dixie, directed by Paul Sloane, starring Stepin Fetchit and Clarence Muse
Hell's Heroes, directed by William Wyler, starring Charles Bickford
High Treason, directed by Maurice Elvey, starring Jameson Thomas and Benita Hume – (GB)
His Glorious Night, directed by Lionel Barrymore, starring John Gilbert
The Hole in the Wall, directed by Robert Florey, starring Edward G. Robinson and Claudette Colbert
The Hollywood Revue of 1929, directed by Charles Reisner, starring Conrad Nagel and Jack Benny
Hot for Paris (lost), directed by Raoul Walsh, starring Victor McLaglen
The Hound of the Baskervilles (Der Hund von Baskerville), directed by Richard Oswald, based on the 1902 novel by Arthur Conan Doyle – (Germany)
House of Horror (lost), directed by Benjamin Christensen, starring Thelma Todd
The House of Secrets (lost), directed by Edmund Lawrence, based on the 1926 novel by Sydney Horler

I
The Informer, directed by Arthur Robison, starring Lya De Putti and Lars Hanson – (GB)
The Iron Mask, directed by Allan Dwan, starring Douglas Fairbanks

K
The Kiss, Jacques Feyder, starring Greta Garbo and Conrad Nagel
Kitty, directed by Victor Saville – (GB)
A Knight in London (Eine Nacht in London), directed by Lupu Pick, starring Lilian Harvey – (GB/Germany)

L
The Lady Fare, directed by William Watson, screenplay by Spencer Williams Jr.
The Lady Lies, directed by Hobart Henley, starring Walter Huston and Claudette Colbert
Lady of the Pavements, directed by D. W. Griffith, starring William Boyd and Lupe Vélez
Laila, directed by George Schnéevoigt, starring Mona Mårtenson
Land Without Women, directed by Carmine Gallone, starring Conrad Veidt – (Germany)
The Last Performance, directed by Paul Fejos, starring Conrad Veidt and Mary Philbin
The Letter, directed by Jean de Limur, starring Jeanne Eagels
The Locked Door, directed by George Fitzmaurice, starring Rod La Rocque and Barbara Stanwyck
The Love Parade, directed by Ernst Lubitsch, starring Maurice Chevalier and Jeanette MacDonald
Lucky Star, directed by Frank Borzage, starring Janet Gaynor and Charles Farrell
Ludwig II, King of Bavaria (Ludwig der Zweite, König von Bayern), starring and directed by William Dieterle – (Germany)

M
Marianne, directed by Robert Z. Leonard, starring Marion Davies
Madame X, directed by Lionel Barrymore, starring Ruth Chatterton and Lewis Stone
Man with a Movie Camera (Chelovek s kinoapparatom), documentary directed by Dziga Vertov – (USSR)
The Manxman, directed by Alfred Hitchcock – (GB)
Married in Hollywood (lost), directed by Marcel Silver
Melody of the Heart, directed by Hanns Schwarz, starring Dita Parlo and Willy Fritsch – (Germany)
The Miraculous Life of Thérèse Martin (La Vie miraculeuse de Thérèse Martin), directed by Julien Duvivier – (France)
Les Mystères du Château de Dé (The Mysteries of the Chateau of Dice), starring and directed by Man Ray – (France)
The Mysterious Dr. Fu Manchu, directed by Rowland V. Lee, starring Warner Oland, Neil Hamilton and Jean Arthur, based on the 1913 novel The Mystery of Dr. Fu-Manchu by Sax Rohmer
The Mysterious Island, directed by Lucien Hubbard, starring Lionel Barrymore

N
Navy Blues, directed by Clarence Brown, starring William Haines, Anita Page and Karl Dane
The New Babylon (Novyy Vavilon), directed by Grigori Kozintsev and Leonid Trauberg – (USSR)
New York Nights, directed by Lewis Milestone, starring Norma Talmadge and Gilbert Roland

O
On with the Show!, directed by Alan Crosland
The Organist at St. Vitus' Cathedral (Varhaník u sv. Víta), directed by Martin Frič – (Czechoslovakia)

P
Pandora's Box (Die Büchse der Pandora), directed by G. W. Pabst, starring Louise Brooks – (Germany)
Paris (lost), directed by Clarence G. Badger, starring Irène Bordoni
Patria Amore, starring Julian Manansala – (Philippines)
Piccadilly, directed by E. A. Dupont, starring Anna May Wong and Gilda Gray – (GB)
Pointed Heels, directed by A. Edward Sutherland, starring William Powell and Fay Wray

Q
Queen Kelly, directed by Erich von Stroheim, starring Gloria Swanson

R
Rain, documentary directed by Mannus Franken and Joris Ivens – (Netherlands)
Rasputin, directed by Max Neufeld – (Germany)
Redskin, directed by Victor Schertzinger, starring Richard Dix
The Rescue, directed by Herbert Brenon, starring Ronald Colman and Lili Damita
Resia Boroboedoer (Secret of Borobudur) – (Dutch East Indies)
The Return of the Rat, directed by Graham Cutts, starring Ivor Novello and Isabel Jeans – (GB)
The Return of Sherlock Holmes, directed by Basil Dean, starring Clive Brook
Rio Rita, directed by Luther Reed, starring Bebe Daniels and John Boles
The River (lost), directed by Frank Borzage, starring Charles Farrell and Mary Duncan
The Runaway Princess, directed by Anthony Asquith and Fritz Wendhausen, starring Mady Christians – (GB/Germany)

S
Sa Landas ng Pag-ibig (The Path of Love), directed by José Nepomuceno – (Philippines)
Sally, directed by John Francis Dillon, starring Marilyn Miller, Joe E. Brown and Pert Kelton
Salute, directed by John Ford, and starring George O'Brien, Helen Chandler and Stepin Fetchit
The Saturday Night Kid, directed by A. Edward Sutherland, starring Clara Bow and Jean Arthur
Seven Footprints to Satan, written and directed by Benjamin Christensen, starring Thelma Todd and Creighton Hale
Seven Keys to Baldpate, directed by Reginald Barker, starring Richard Dix, based on the 1913 novel by Earl Derr Biggers and stage play by George M. Cohan
Show Boat, directed by Harry A. Pollard, starring Laura La Plante and Joseph Schildkraut, based on the 1926 novel by Edna Ferber
The Show of Shows, directed by John G. Adolfi
Side Street, directed by Malcolm St. Clair, starring the Moore Brothers
The Silent House, directed by Walter Forde, based on the 1928 novel by John G. Brandon
The Singing Brakeman, a short featuring Jimmie Rodgers
The Single Standard, directed by John S. Robertson, starring Greta Garbo, Nils Asther and Johnny Mack Brown
The Skeleton Dance, a Walt Disney animated short
Smilin' Guns, directed by Henry MacRae, starring Hoot Gibson
Spite Marriage, directed by Edward Sedgwick and Buster Keaton, starring Buster Keaton
St. Louis Blues, directed by Dudley Murphy, starring Bessie Smith
Den starkaste (The Strongest), directed by Axel Lindblom and Alf Sjöberg – (Sweden)
Stark Mad (lost), directed by Lloyd Bacon, starring H. B. Warner and Louise Fazenda
Street Girl, directed by Wesley Ruggles, starring Betty Compson
Sunny Side Up, directed by David Butler, starring Janet Gaynor and Charles Farrell
Syncopation, directed by Bert Glennon

T
The Taming of the Shrew, directed by Sam Taylor, starring Mary Pickford and Douglas Fairbanks
The Thirteenth Chair, directed by Tod Browning, starring Conrad Nagel and Leila Hyams, based on the 1916 stage play by Bayard Veiller
This Thing Called Love (lost), directed by Paul L. Stein, starring Edmund Lowe and Constance Bennett
The Three Kings (Ein Mädel und drei Clowns), directed by Hans Steinhoff – (GB/Germany)
The Three Passions, directed by Rex Ingram, starring Alice Terry – (GB)
Thunder (lost), directed by William Nigh, starring Lon Chaney and Phyllis Haver
Thunderbolt, directed by Josef von Sternberg, starring George Bancroft, Fay Wray and Richard Arlen
A Throw of Dice, directed by Franz Osten – (Germany/GB/India)
The Trespasser, directed by Edmund Goulding, starring Gloria Swanson and Robert Ames
Turksib, documentary directed by Viktor Alexandrovitsh Turin – (U.S.S.R.)

U
The Unholy Night, directed by Lionel Barrymore, starring Ernest Torrence and Roland Young

V
The Vagabond Lover, directed by Marshall Neilan, starring Rudy Vallée and Marie Dressler
The Virginian, directed by Victor Fleming, starring Gary Cooper, Walter Huston, Richard Arlen and Mary Brian

W
Wait and See, starring and directed by Walter Forde – (GB)
Wall Street, directed by Roy William Neill, starring Ralph Ince and Aileen Pringle
Welcome Danger, directed by Clyde Bruckman, starring Harold Lloyd
Where East Is East, directed by Tod Browning, starring Lon Chaney, Lupe Vélez and Estelle Taylor
The White Hell of Pitz Palu (Die weiße Hölle vom Piz Palü), directed by Arnold Fanck and G. W. Pabst, starring Leni Riefenstahl – (Germany)
Why Be Good?, directed by William A. Seiter, starring Colleen Moore and Neil Hamilton
Wild Orchids, directed by Sidney Franklin, starring Greta Garbo, Lewis Stone and Nils Asther
Wolf Song, directed by Victor Fleming, starring Gary Cooper, Lupe Vélez and Louis Wolheim
Woman in the Moon (Frau im Mond), directed by Fritz Lang – (Germany)
The Woman in White, directed by Herbert Wilcox, starring Blanche Sweet, based on the 1859 novel by Wilkie Collins – (GB)
Wonder of Women (lost), directed by Clarence Brown, starring Lewis Stone and Leila Hyams
The Wonderful Lies of Nina Petrovna (Die wunderbare Lüge der Nina Petrowna), directed by Hanns Schwarz – (Germany)
Words and Music, directed by James Tinling
The Wrecker (Der Würger), directed by Géza von Bolváry – (GB/Germany)

Serials
The Ace of Scotland Yard, 10 chapters (215 minutes)
The Black Book, 10 chapters
The Diamond Master, 10 chapters
The Fatal Warning, 10 chapters (200 min)
The Fire Detective, 10 chapters
The King of the Kongo, 10 chapters (213 min)
The Pirate of Panama, 12 chapters
Queen of the Northwoods, 10 chapters
Tarzan the Tiger, 15 chapters (266 min)

Short film series
Buster Keaton (1917–1941)
Our Gang (1922–1944)
Laurel and Hardy (1921–1943)

Animated short film series
Felix the Cat (1919–1936)
Aesop's Film Fables (1921–1933)
Krazy Kat (1925–1940)
Oswald the Lucky Rabbit
 Homeless Homer
 Yanky Clippers
 Hen Fruit
 Sick Cylinders
 Hold ‘em Ozzie
 The Suicide Sheik
 Alpine Antics
 The Lumberjack
 The Fishing Fool
 Stage Stunts
 Stripes and Stars
 The Wicked West
 Ice Man's Luck
 Nuts and Jolts
 Jungle Jingles
 Weary Willies
 Saucy Sausages
Inkwell Imps (1927–1929)
Mickey Mouse
 The Opry House
 When The Cat's Away
 The Barnyard Battle
 The Plow Boy
 The Karnival Kid
 Mickey's Follies
 Mickey's Choo-Choo
 The Jazz Fool
 Wild Waves
 Jungle Rhythm
 The Haunted House
Silly Symphonies
 The Skeleton Dance
 El Terrible Toreador
 Springtime
 Hell's Bells
 The Merry Dwarfs
Screen Songs (1929–1938)
Talkartoons (1929–1932)

Births
 January 1 – Haruo Nakajima, Japanese actor (died 2017)
 January 3 – Sergio Leone, Italian director, producer and screenwriter (died 1989)
 January 7 – Terry Moore, American actress
 January 8 – Saeed Jaffrey, Indian-born actor (died 2015)
 January 9 – Ulu Grosbard, Belgian-American theatre and film director and film producer (died 2012)
 January 20 – Arte Johnson, American actor (died 2019)
 January 31 – Jean Simmons, English-American actress (died 2010)
 February 4 – Jerry Adler, American actor
 February 8  – Claude Rich, French actor (died 2017)
 February 10 – Jerry Goldsmith, American composer (died 2004)
 February 14
Roman Kłosowski, Polish actor (died 2018)
Allan Miller, American actor and director
 Vic Morrow, American actor (died 1982)
 February 22
James Hong, American actor, voice actor, producer and director of Chinese descent
Donald May, American actor (died 2022)
Rebecca Schull, American actress
 March 4 - Columba Domínguez, Mexican actress (died 2014)
 March 10 - Harry Bugin, American actor and musician (died 2005)
 March 11 – Timothy Carey, American actor (died 1994)
 March 13 – Peter Breck, American actor (died 2012)
 March 16 - Nadja Tiller, Austrian actress (died 2023)
 March 23 – Mark Rydell, American actor, director and producer
 March 24 – Pat Renella, American actor (died 2012)
 March 27 – Anne Ramsey, American actress (died 1988)
 April 1 – Jane Powell, American actress, singer and dancer (died 2021)
 April 5 – Nigel Hawthorne, English actor (died 2001)
 April 10
Liz Sheridan, American actress (died 2022)
Max von Sydow, Swedish actor (died 2020)
 April 15 – Mariano Laurenti, Italian director and actor (died 2022)
 April 17 – Michael Forest, American actor
 April 28 – Bhanu Athaiya, Indian costume designer (died 2020)
 May 2 – Eddie Garcia, Filipino actor (died 2019)
 May 4 – Audrey Hepburn, British actress (died 1993)
 May 5 – Ilene Woods, American actress and singer (died 2010)
 May 11 - Margaret Kerry, American actress and director
 May 17 – Miriam Byrd-Nethery, American actress (died 2003)
 May 23 – Paul Wexler, American actor (died 1979)
 May 25 – Ann Robinson, American actress
 May 26 – Lloyd Reckord, Jamaican actor and filmmaker (died 2015)
 May 28 – Shane Rimmer, Canadian actor (died 2019)
 May 31 – Menahem Golan, Israeli director and producer (died 2014)
 June 3 – Chuck Barris, American game show host (died 2017)
 June 8 – Gastone Moschin, Italian actor (died 2017)
 June 16 – Gerson da Cunha, Indian actor (died 2022)
 June 17 – James Shigeta, American actor, singer and musician of Japanese descent (died 2014)
 June 20 – Bonnie Bartlett, American actress
 June 23 – Claude Goretta, Swiss producer and director (died 2019)
 July 5 – Katherine Helmond, American actress (died 2019)
 July 11 – David Kelly (actor), Irish actor (died 2012)
 July 21
Asta Vihandi, Estonian opera singer, actress and dancer (died 1993)
John Woodvine, English actor
 July 23 – Maya Buzinova, Russian animator (died 2022)
 July 31 – Don Murray (actor), American actor
 August 1 – Camillo Milli, Italian actor (died 2022)
 August 12 - John Bluthal, Australian actor and comedian (died 2018)
 August 15 – George Martin (American actor), American actor (died 2010)
 August 21 
Vija Artmane, Latvian actress (died 2008)
John McMartin, American actor (died 2016)
 August 23 – Vera Miles, American actress
 August 28 – Ken Gampu, South African actor (died 2003)
 September 2 – Hal Ashby, American director (died 1988)
 September 3 – Irene Papas, Greek actress (died 2022)
 September 4 – Nina Urgant, Russian actress (died 2021)
 September 5
Edward S. Feldman, American producer (died 2020)
Bob Newhart, American actor and comedian
 September 11 – Eve Brent, American actress (died 2011)
 September 18 – Elizabeth Spriggs, English actress (died 2008)
 September 20
 Kurt Kren, Austrian experimental director (died 1998)
 Vittorio Taviani, Italian director (died 2018)
 September 21 – Elsa Raven, American character actress (died 2020)
 September 22 – Maria Charles, English actress, director and comedian
 September 25 – Barbara Walters, American broadcast journalist and television personality (died 2022)
 September 28 - Frances Taylor Davis, American dancer and actress (died 2018)
 October 2 – Moses Gunn, American actor (died 1993)
 October 14 – Norbert Gastell, German voice actor (died 2015)
 October 15 - Witold Sobociński, Polish actor (died 2018)
 October 16
Jane Griffiths, English actress (died 1975)
Fernanda Montenegro, Brazilian actress
 October 24 – Clifford Rose, English actor (died 2021)
 October 28
Jack Hedley, British actor (died 2021)
Joan Plowright, English actress
 November 6 – June Squibb, American actress
 November 12
Etchika Choureau, French actress (died 2022)
Grace Kelly, American-Monégasque actress (died 1982)
 November 15 – Ed Asner, American actor (died 2021)
 November 20 – Jerry Hardin, American actor
 November 21 – Niall Tóibín, Irish actor and comedian (died 2019)
 November 28 – Berry Gordy, American producer
 November 30 – Joan Ganz Cooney, American television writer and producer
 December 1 – David Doyle, American actor (died 1997)
 December 6 – Alain Tanner, Swiss film director (died 2022)
 December 8 – Paddy O'Byrne, Irish radio broadcaster and actor (died 2013)
 December 9 – John Cassavetes, American actor, director (died 1989)
 December 13 – Christopher Plummer, Canadian actor (died 2021)

Deaths
 January 5 – Marc McDermott, Australian actor (born 1881)
 February 18
Hardee Kirkland, American stage and screen actor (born 1868)
William Russell, American actor (born 1884)
 February 24 – Frank Keenan, American actor (born 1858)
 May 9 – Fred C. Truesdell, stage & film actor (born 1870)
 May 12 – Charles Swickard, German-American director and actor (born 1861)
 July 2 – Gladys Brockwell, American actress (born 1894)
 July 3 – Dustin Farnum, American stage & silent screen star (born 1874)
 July 6 – Cliff Bowes, American comedian (born 1894)
 August 2 – Mae Costello, American actress (born 1882)
 September 2 – Paul Leni, German film and art director (born 1885)
 October 3 – Jeanne Eagels, American actress (born 1890)
 October 31 – Norman Trevor, actor, Olympic athlete (born 1877)
 November 2 – Leo D. Maloney, actor and director (born 1888)
 November 24 – Raymond Hitchcock, American actor (born 1865)

Film debuts

 Lew Ayres – The Sophomore
 Jackie Cooper – Fox Movietone Follies of 1929
 Brian Donlevy – Gentlemen of the Press
 James Dunn – In the Nick of Time
 Glenda Farrell – Lucky Boy
 Kay Francis – Gentlemen of the Press
 Judy Garland – The Big Revue
 Paulette Goddard – Berth Marks
 Betty Grable – Happy Days
 John Huston – The Shakedown
 Walter Huston – Gentlemen of the Press
 Dean Jagger – The Woman from Hell
 Peter Lorre – Die verschwundene Frau
 Jeanette MacDonald – The Love Parade
 Fred MacMurray – Girls Gone Wild
 Marx Brothers – The Cocoanuts
 Ray Milland – Piccadilly
 Robert Montgomery – The Single Standard
 Paul Muni – The Valiant
 George Raft – Queen of the Night Clubs
 Ginger Rogers – A Day of a Man of Affairs
 Sylvia Sidney – Thru Different Eyes
 Johnny Weissmuller – Glorifying the American Girl

References

 
Film by year